ESPN College Basketball is a blanket title used for presentations of college basketball on ESPN and its family of networks. Its coverage focuses primarily on competition in NCAA Division I, holding broadcast rights to games from each major conference, and a number of mid-major conferences.

ESPN was the first broadcaster to provide extensive early-round coverage of NCAA Men's Division I Basketball Championship, prior to CBS, later in partnership with Turner Sports, holding sole rights to "March Madness". The network also covers a number of early-season tournaments, conference championships, and is also the exclusive broadcaster of the National Invitation Tournament and the Women's Division I championship.

History

1979–1989
ESPN has aired college basketball games from its inception, starting in 1979 with DePaul's victory over Wisconsin with a then-novice color commentator Dick Vitale and Joe Boyle doing the play-by-play. In the early days, Vitale was paired with veteran sportscaster Jim Simpson.

One of the first milestone events that ESPN covered was the NCAA tournament. In 1980, the fledgling channel had a total of 23 tournament games. More specifically, ESPN aired the NCAA Productions telecasts of all 16 first-round games (12 on tape delay). Jay Randolph, Gary Thompson, Steve Shannon, Steve Grad, Fred White, Larry Conley, Bill O'Donnell, Bucky Waters, and Jeff Mullins were among the commentators. ESPN again aired 16 first-round games (12 on tape delay) produced by NCAA Productions in 1981. That year, ESPN aired the BYU-Notre Dame (at Atlanta) with Bill O'Donnell and Jeff Mullins on the call. This particular game soon became famous for Danny Ainge's coast-to-coast buzzer beater to send BYU to Elite 8. ESPN also aired the last Final Four consolation game at 5 p.m. on March 30, 1981.

They intensively covered the early rounds of March Madness, gaining the entire tournament much prestige. The early rounds of course were not the most ideal time, many games taking place during work hours. When CBS gained exclusive coverage in 1991, they would largely mimic how their predecessor had covered the event. ESPN aired the NCAA productions telecasts of all 16 first-round games (12 on tape delay).

During the 1985 NCAA tournament, ESPN aired five live games on each first round day which, combined with the CBS games and the around the clock ESPN tape delayed games, made for almost non-stop basketball for 55 consecutive hours from Thursday noon through early Saturday evening. With four games at each first round site, NCAA Productions typically sent two announcer crews to each site to call two games each.

One of the next milestones in ESPN's coverage was when they aired Championship Week for the first time in 1986 (the term would be coined later however). The network was given critical acclaim for its coverage of the conference tournaments, of bouncing from game to the next. It also raised the profile of many "mid-major" and "minor" conferences who received their only national attention during a single game, usually the championship game of their conference tournament. Like everything else with ESPN, the success and expansion of the network led to more games being televised in this made-for-TV event.

1987 was the last year that ESPN was involved in the regional semifinals of the NCAA Tournament. John Saunders was ESPN's studio host in the afternoon while Bob Ley was the studio host in the evening. Dick Vitale served as the studio analyst for both men. In 1989, Tim Brando became the afternoon studio host while John Saunders moved to the evening. And then a year later, Chris Fowler replaced Brando as the afternoon studio host. As previously mentioned, 1990 was also the last year ESPN/NCAA Productions' involvement.

In the late 1980s and early 1990s with only a single network; no regional or internet coverage, ESPN televised around 200 games a year.

1990s

In 1991, they would lose coverage of the early rounds of the NCAA Tournament but would continue to televise just as many regular season games and conference tournament games.

In 1993, ESPN aired the Women's Selection Show for the first time ever. Unlike the men's tournament, ESPN is the only network that airs the unveiling.

In 1996, ESPN and ESPN2 aired a total of 281 men's games and 22 women's games.

2000s
ESPN has rapidly increased its coverage throughout the years as the network as expanded from a single cable channel to a multiple outlets including the internet.

In 2003, ESPN and its sister networks aired all the games of the Women's NCAA Tournament for the first time ever, a practice that still exists today.

On March 4, 2005, ESPNU premiered on the outset of a Texas–Oklahoma State game from Stillwater, Oklahoma with a special two-hour edition of College GameDay. ESPNU has aired the first set of games of each season, beginning in its initial season of 2005.

In 2005–06, the ESPN family of networks aired 884 games (they aired 140 women's games that year). However the following season, they aired over 1000 games.

In 2007, ESPNU as well as ESPN2 aired the first-ever NIT Selection Show. Also, ESPN Radio aired its first-ever coverage of the Selection Sunday. Also that year, a then-record of more than 3.3 million brackets entered on ESPN.com surpassing the record set the previous year.

During the 2007–2008 season, the ESPN networks aired a total of more than 1,050 men's games and 150 women's games. ESPNU aired over 250 games. In addition, ESPN aired Pac-10 games for the first time since 1995, through a new agreement with FSN. They showed a total of 2 games. The year was marked by Dick Vitale missing his first assignment ever due to surgery. He was replaced by Jay Bilas on Saturday Primetime. He returned on February 6 for the UNC-Duke matchup. Due to the 2008 Atlanta tornado outbreak, ESPN2, instead of CBS, aired the 2008 SEC tournament finals from Alexander Memorial Coliseum on the campus of Georgia Tech. However, CBS production was utilized including talent and graphics. ESPN had a record 3.65 million entries for the Tournament Challenge.

Legendary basketball coach Bob Knight retired from coaching in February 2008, he joined ESPN, the following month as a studio analyst for Championship Week and later appeared during the NCAA tournament, including on location from San Antonio at the Final Four. His role was greatly expanded during the 2008–09 season, when he appeared on many platforms including a weekly Thursday game as well as College GameDay.

The ESPN networks aired about 1,100 games during the 2008–09 season, including 148 women's games (including the entire NCAA Tournament).

In the 2009–10 season, ESPN began a 15-year deal to serve as the main rightsholder of the SEC. The package initially contained a broadcast television package via ESPN Regional Television (SEC Network, later SEC TV), which replaced the conference's long-standing association with Raycom Sports. ESPN later launched an SEC Network cable network.

2010s

In 2010, ESPN reached a deal for rights to Atlantic Coast Conference (ACC) basketball and football, while still maintaining Raycom's long-standing syndicated package. In July 2016, ESPN announced an extension of the agreement, which would include the formation of the ACC Network cable channel, and the end of Raycom's broadcast television package after the 2018–19 season. In 2017, ESPN renewed its rights to the Big Ten through the 2022–23 season.

In 2017, ESPN unveiled a significantly redesigned on-air presentation for college basketball games; ESPN explained that the new branding was designed to reflect the fan culture and tribalism of the game.

2020s 
In August 2022, ESPN lost its rights to the Big Ten after the upcoming 2022–23 season. In October 2022, ESPN renewed with the Big 12 Conference.

Coverage

Game coverage
ESPN broadcasts weekly games in various windows. Its flagship weekly games are 

 Big Monday: A Monday-night doubleheader on ESPN, aired after the conclusion of football season (which until then is occupied by Monday Night Football). Since the 2013–14 season, it has consisted of an Atlantic Coast Conference (ACC) game, followed by a Big 12 Conference game. Prior to its realignment in the 2013–14 season, the Big East was featured as the early game alongside the Big 12 (hence the title). The second game was initially a Big Ten game; in the 1991–92 season, they were moved to an early window on Tuesdays in favor of the then-Big Eight Conference, citing that the conference's territorial footprint was more favorable for 9:30 p.m. ET starts than the Big Ten. Previously, the block also featured a third, west coast game at 9 p.m. PT, which in the past had featured games involving conferences such as the Big West, Western Athletic Conference (WAC), and West Coast Conference (WCC).
 Super Tuesday, a Tuesday-night doubleheader on ESPN featuring Big Ten and Southeastern Conference (SEC) games.
 Wednesday Night Hoops
 Thursday Night Showcase
 Saturday Primetime

ESPN currently airs many pre-season tournaments and showcases, some of which organized by ESPN Events, including the AdvoCare Invitational, the ACC–Big Ten Challenge (from 1999 through 2022), the Champions Classic, the Jimmy V Classic, and the NIT Season Tip-Off. The Jimmy V Classic is accompanied by "Jimmy V Week", a charity appeal across ESPN's networks for the V Foundation for Cancer Research. The event traditionally includes an airing of Jim Valvano's speech at the 1993 ESPY Awards, where he addressed his condition and announced the formation of the charity. 

The final week of the regular season is branded as "Bracket Builder Week" (formerly "Judgment Week"), while "Champ Week" (formerly "Championship Week") is used as a blanket branding for coverage of conference tournaments. ESPN formerly broadcast other in-season events, including 

 The Tip-Off Marathon, held from 2008 through 2017, was a marathon of live games and other studio programs across ESPN's networks to mark the first day of the college basketball season. The first edition of the event featured 14 games and 33 hours of programming across ESPN, ESPN2, and ESPNU, beginning with a late-night tripleheader that started at midnight ET. 
 Until 2014, ESPN held an annual slate of games known as BracketBusters, which showcased teams in mid-major conferences considered to be potential at-large selections for the NCAA tournament field.
 ESPNU Campus Connection Week (originally "Student Spirit Week") was formerly featured across a week of game broadcasts in January, which featured segments profiling student-athletes, students taking on selected production and on-air roles, student-produced segments aired during games, and reports from student sections.

March Madness
While domestic rights to the NCAA men's tournament are held by CBS and Turner Sports, ESPN International distributes coverage of the tournament internationally, and produces its own feed of the Final Four and championship game using the ESPN College Basketball staff. In 2013, ESPN International's Final Four coverage was called by Dan Shulman and Dick Vitale (alternatively joined by Brad Nessler for one of the semi-final games).

Non-games
ESPN has traditionally aired coverage of non-game action including Midnight Madness, which it help popularize by airing the first practices.

College GameDay which grew as a spin-off of the popular football series is a weekly series that airs during conference play and post-season action. The main difference however is that the sites are pre-determined based on the location of the Saturday Primetime match-up. The show incorporates many of the features and is similar to the football edition.

During the NCAA tournament, many ESPN personalities including Dick Vitale appear to discuss the tournament. In addition during the Final Four, there is an on-location set. Typically special editions of College Gameday and SportsCenter appear during this time. In 2017, alongside its selection shows for the NIT and Women's NCAA Division I tournament, ESPN first held the Tournament Challenge Marathon—a 24-hour-long slate of programming (including special editions of existing ESPN studio shows) devoted to bracketology. The event was co-promoted with ESPN.com's ESPN Tournament Challenge bracket game, and contained charitable appeals for the Jimmy V Foundation. The event was revived in 2018, with a 25-hour marathon of tournament-related programming.

ESPNU airs a National Signing Day, first premiering in 2008. It was done due to the popularity of the football edition.

Women's coverage
ESPN has greatly expanded its coverage of the women's game, which now includes the entire NCAA Women's Division I Basketball Championship tournament, culminating with the Final Four. They air many of the same pre-season and conference tournaments as the men do including Jimmy V Women's Basketball Classic, Holiday Hoops,  ESPNU Campus Connection Week, February Frenzy, Rivalry Week, and Championship Week. The season begins with the State Farm Tip-Off Classic. ESPN2 airs a weekly Big Monday game in primetime. In addition, ESPN airs the Maggie Dixon Classic. Every February, ESPN2 airs February Frenzy. They air multiple games in a telecast window(s) and go to the games whip-around style. The Women's Selection Show is aired on ESPN including bonus coverage on ESPNU on Selection Monday after many years of being overshadowed by the men's show.

Criticism
ESPN is often accused of having a bias towards certain teams, including the Atlantic Coast Conference (ACC), particularly the Duke Blue Devils and North Carolina Tar Heels. ESPN and the ACC have a rights deal that extends through the 2026–27 season which provides additional football, men's and women's basketball and Olympic sports coverage on a variety of platforms, suggesting the bias may have a financial motivation. In addition, ESPN has also been very fond of the Kentucky Wildcats as most of ESPN's Super Tuesday weeks usually tends to feature a game involving Kentucky, even when it's playing against one of the lesser SEC teams.

Dick Vitale is often criticized for being a "homer" for Duke, especially for Coach Mike Krzyzewski, as well as most teams in the ACC (for example, a February 28, 2017 game between Indiana vs. Purdue game was scheduled to be on ESPN but was demoted to ESPN2 in favor of Florida State vs. Duke). He is also known for mentioning Duke frequently during broadcasts, even when Duke is not playing. Temple head coach John Chaney once said "You can't get Dick Vitale to say 15 words without Duke coming out of his mouth". He is sometimes called "Duke Vitale" or "Dookie V", a take-off on his "Dickie V" nickname, by detractors for the same reason. Although his bias towards Duke is widely speculated by many, he is also believed to favor the entire ACC in general, including Duke's rival, North Carolina as well as Kentucky.

A large number of college basketball games are covered off-site, with announcers watching games on television at a studio at Bristol or Los Angeles. For instance, some 2016 NCAA Women's Division I Basketball Championship games are produced off-site.

Typical games
During the regular season, typical games that are shown almost every year on the ESPN family of networks include Duke-North Carolina, Michigan-Michigan State, Florida-Kentucky, Texas Tech-Texas, and Kansas-Kansas State.

Championship Week always features most Division I conference tournaments including expanding coverage of the "major" conferences. The "mid-major" and/or "minor" conferences will typically only get the latter rounds of the tournaments carried, if not, only the conference finale game.

Personalities

See also
Men's college basketball on television
 College GameNight
 College Basketball on ABC
 College Basketball on CBS
 College Basketball on NBC
 CBS Sports Network
 Big Ten Network
 MountainWest Sports Network

References

 
1979 American television series debuts
1970s American television series
1980s American television series
1990s American television series
2000s American television series
2010s American television series
2020s American television series
ESPN original programming
Sports telecast series
ESPN